Saranya is a Hindu goddess. Saranya may also refer to:

 Saranya Bhagyaraj (born 1984), Indian actress
 Saranya Mohan (born 1989), Indian actress
 Saranya Ponvannan (born 1970), Indian actress
 Saranya Nag, Indian actress
 Saranya Sasi (1986–2021), Indian actress 

Indian feminine given names